Cound is a civil parish in Shropshire, England.  It contains 51 listed buildings that are recorded in the National Heritage List for England.  Of these, two are listed at Grade I, the highest of the three grades, three are at Grade II*, the middle grade, and the others are at Grade II, the lowest grade.  The parish contains the small villages of Cound, Upper Cound and Harnage, and is otherwise entirely rural.  Most of the listed buildings are houses and associated structures, cottages, farmhouses and farm buildings, many of which are timber framed, and some have cruck construction.  The other listed buildings include a church and items in the churchyard, a former monastic grange, a former manor house, a country house, two bridges, a public house, two milestones, a milepost, four pumps, and a war memorial


Key

Buildings

References

Citations

Sources

Lists of buildings and structures in Shropshire